Stacy X (real name Miranda Leevald) is a fictional character appearing in American comic books published by Marvel Comics. Created by writer by Joe Casey and artist Tom Raney, she first appeared in Uncanny X-Men #399 (November 2001), when she was known as X-Stacy, and later became known as Ripcord. Stacy X belongs to the subspecies of humans called mutants, who are born with superhuman abilities She was briefly affiliated with the X-Men and was later known as a member of the New Warriors.

Publication history 
Stacy X made her debut in Uncanny X-Men #399 (November 2001), created by  Joe Casey and Tom Raney.

Fictional character biography
Stacy-X first appeared in Uncanny X-Men #399 (November 2001). Her real name is Miranda Leevald, and she has the mutant ability to exude pheromones which she could control to stimulate bodily sensations and functions of others, such as causing orgasms or vomiting. Her mutation also had a physical manifestation: at the age of sixteen Stacy's skin was replaced by patterned, snake-like scales. At one point, her skin was shown shedding much like a real snake's. She later became known as Stacy-X.

She first appeared as a member of the Nevada mutant brothel, the X-Ranch. After the hate group the Church of Humanity destroys the ranch, Stacy joins the X-Men. Forthright and argumentative, Stacy did not take easily to teamwork and left the team shortly after joining. She plays a vital role in fighting Black Tom, using her powers to seduce him and releasing the other trapped X-Men, allowing them to defeat him. She also proved to be a highly skilled fighter, even giving Wolverine a proper workout. Where she got this training is unknown, much like everything else about her past.

Soon after the events at the X-Ranch, Stacy stayed at the Institute. She took some time off after "servicing a special client" in Chappaqua, New York. Wolverine tracked her down and fought with her, but soon the two came to an understanding. Whether Wolverine convinced Stacy to completely abandon her former profession is unknown, but he did talk Nightcrawler out of whatever censure he was contemplating. It was known that Stacy continued to work for "special clients" even as she operated as a member of the X-Men. Furthermore, during her membership with the X-Men she tried to seduce members Archangel and Nightcrawler.

She became a team member who was highly depended upon. At one point when Chamber and Nightcrawler were stranded in the mountains, Chamber telepathically communicated with Stacy X. While she brought help, she was upset that Chamber invaded her mind without permission until Chamber told her she was the only one he thought would believe him as his telepathic powers were still new.

At one point, Miranda works with a food magnate who is very sick. He reveals himself as a mutant with debilitating mutations: advanced aging has made him old before his time, and he has developed an immunity to all painkillers. She changes his body chemistry so that he will live out the rest of his short life without pain.

After a spat with Paige (alias Husk), caused by the fact that they both were in love with Archangel, Miranda decides to leave the mansion. (She knew about Paige's love as she could see her lust with her ability to see people's emotions through their pheromones.) However, she left behind for Archangel a video of herself jumping rope naked, stating that she did not want to stay around them. Rather, this will indicate to him that he missed the chance to have had someone as sexy as herself as a girlfriend, instead of Paige.

Decimation and New Warriors
Due to the Scarlet Witch's magic, Miranda is one of the many mutants to lose her powers after the events of Decimation. While she was a prostitute when she had her powers, she never actually slept with anyone for money, relying on her pheromone powers. Since she lost her powers, this has apparently changed.

She becomes a member of the reformed New Warriors under the codename Ripcord. The circumstances of how she joined are not completely revealed, but her attitude and statements show that she wanted to change her life, and going back to being a hero seems like the path she chose best to do it.  Besides being given artificial powers to replace what she lost, she apparently also has lost her leftover scaled skin. She was killed in an accident along with Skybolt.

Vengeance
Stacy X mysteriously re-appears later. She is shown having a three-way sexual encounter with Welsh pop star Sugar Kane (Chamber's onetime girlfriend) and new character Ultimate Nullifier in a high-rise hotel room after they are at a nightclub. The trio is interrupted by the sudden arrival of Magneto, who seeks to discipline Stacy for what he considers to be her disgraceful decadence which is embarrassingly tarnishing the collective image of Earth's too few remaining mutants. Magneto proceeds to magnetically thrash the room and toss all of them around. However, Ultimate Nullifier engages in combat with Magneto while Stacy and Sugar Kane make their escape. Successfully subduing Magneto by depowering him with a power-dampening gun and beating him with formidable martial arts skills, Ultimate Nullifier then reveals to Magneto that he was actually secretly acting as a bodyguard to Stacy and that it is his mission to protect her from Magneto.

Powers and abilities
Stacy X can produce sensations and physical reactions in anyone, such as orgasms, vomiting or adrenaline rushes, and can heal others by speeding up their healing process, due the pheromones she secretes. Initially, she had to make physical contact to produce these sensations and physical reactions. Later, she became able to influence others without making direct contact with others, by launching her pheromones through the air.

Stacy X has a scaly, snake-like skin, which increases her durability, although the limit of her durability has never been demonstrated.

Additionally, she is an expert fighter, having some martial arts abilities, and was able to even challenge Wolverine.

Reception

Accolades 

 In 2010, ComicsAlliance ranked Stacy X 3rd in their "5 Superheroes Who Used Their Powers For Sex" list.
 In 2014, Entertainment Weekly ranked Stacy X 92nd in their "Let's rank every X-Man ever" list.
 In 2014, BuzzFeed ranked Stacy X 84th in their "95 X-Men Members Ranked From Worst To Best" list.
 In 2017, Screen Rant included Stacy X in their "15 Superheroes Marvel Wants You To Forget" list.
 In 2018, DirecTV included Stacy X in their "8 Marvel Characters That Should Join Deadpool Movie Universe" list.
 In 2020, Scary Mommy included Stacy X in their "Looking For A Role Model? These 195+ Marvel Female Characters Are Truly Heroic" list.
 in 2021, Looper included Stacy X in their "Best Marvel Mutant Powers Not Used For Fighting" list.

Other versions

Ultimate X-Men 
Ultimate Stacy X is introduced in Ultimate X-Men as the girlfriend of Mastermind, and she stays with him in the cell where he is currently impersonating Magneto, replacing Mystique (who was doing the same after he escaped during the events of the "Magnetic North" storyline). In Ultimate Comics: X-Men she is seen in Camp Angel, camps where mutants are forced to live by the government in the aftermath of the Ultimatum Wave. She considers herself a political prisoner of war and urges mutants into revolution.

In other media

Film 

 Stacy X was originally supposed to appear in the third X-Men film, X-Men: The Last Stand, with Dania Ramirez auditioning for the character.

References

External links
 Stacy X at marvel.com
 List of comics featuring Stacy X at marvel.com
 List of comics featuring the Ultimate Universe Stacy X at marvel.com

Comics characters introduced in 2001
Fictional bisexual females
Fictional prostitutes
Marvel Comics LGBT superheroes
Marvel Comics martial artists
Marvel Comics mutants
Marvel Comics female superheroes